Brian Frederick Bates (born 4 December 1944) is an English former professional footballer who played as a winger.

Career
Born in Beeston, Bates played for Loughborough College, Notts County, Mansfield Town and Boston United.

References

1944 births
Living people
English footballers
Notts County F.C. players
Mansfield Town F.C. players
Boston United F.C. players
English Football League players
Association football wingers